The Gower Formation is a geologic formation in Illinois and Iowa. It preserves fossils dating back to the Silurian period.

See also

 List of fossiliferous stratigraphic units in Illinois
 List of fossiliferous stratigraphic units in Iowa

References

 

Silurian Illinois
Silurian Iowa
Silurian southern paleotemperate deposits
Silurian southern paleotropical deposits